10 Squadron or 10th Squadron may refer to:

 No. 10 Squadron IAF, a fighter squadron of the Indian Air Force
 No. 10 Squadron RAAF, a unit of the Royal Australian Air Force.
 No. 10 Squadron RCAF, an anti-submarine unit of the Royal Canadian Air Force.
 No. 10 Squadron (Finland), a unit of the Finnish Air Force
 No. 10 Squadron RAF, a unit of the United Kingdom Royal Air Force
 10th Missile Squadron, a unit of the United States Air Force
 10th Space Warning Squadron, a unit of the United States Air Force
 10th Airlift Squadron, a unit of the United States Air Force
 Training Squadron 10, a unit of the United States Navy

See also
 10th Army (disambiguation)
 10th Corps (disambiguation)
 10th Division (disambiguation)
 10th Wing (disambiguation)
 10th Brigade (disambiguation)
 10th Regiment (disambiguation)
 10th Group (disambiguation)
 10th Battalion (disambiguation)